Hyperia may stand for:

 Hyperia (crustacean), a genus of the order Amphipoda
 The ancient Greek name for the island of Amorgos
 In Greek mythology, Hyperia was the daughter of the river god Inachus